Lucy Hope (born 30 January 1997) is an active Scottish elite swimmer representing Scotland and Great Britain. A freestyle specialist, her most significant success has come in freestyle relay for Great Britain, for whom she has won seven gold medals at European level between 2018 and 2022. 

She competed in the women's 4 × 200 metre freestyle relay event at the 2018 European Aquatics Championships, winning the gold medal. She won a further four gold medals in the 2020 European Aquatics Championships in the women's 4 x 100 metre freestyle relay and 4 x 200 metre freestyle relay, and the mixed 4 x 200 metre freestyle relay and 4 x 100 metre freestyle relay In 2022, she was part of the Great Britain team that retained their titles in the women's 4 x 100 metre freestyle and the mixed 4 x 200 metre freestyle, while winning silver medals in the women's 4 x 200 metre freestyle relay and the mixed 4 x 100 metre freestyle relay.

Hope is third on the all time women's list for Great Britain at the European Championship behind Fran Halsall and Freya Anderson.

References

External links
 

1997 births
Living people
Scottish female swimmers
People from Melrose, Scottish Borders
Scottish female freestyle swimmers
European Aquatics Championships medalists in swimming
European Championships (multi-sport event) gold medalists
Swimmers at the 2020 Summer Olympics
Olympic swimmers of Great Britain
Competitors at the 2017 Summer Universiade
20th-century Scottish women
21st-century Scottish women
Swimmers at the 2022 Commonwealth Games
Commonwealth Games competitors for Scotland
Sportspeople from the Scottish Borders